Marco Aurélio Silva Diogo, known as Marco Aurélio (born 24 March 1989) is a Portuguese footballer who plays for Angrense as a forward.

Club career
He made his professional debut in the Segunda Liga for Tondela on 22 January 2014 in a game against União da Madeira.

References

External links

Stats and profile at LPFP 

1989 births
People from Lagoa, Azores
Living people
Portuguese footballers
Association football forwards
G.D. Chaves players
S.C. Espinho players
S.C. Praiense players
C.D. Tondela players
Liga Portugal 2 players
CU Micaelense players